Events from the year 1719 in France

Incumbents
 Monarch – Louis XV
Regent: Philip II of Orleans

Events
1718 to 1720 – The Pontcallec Conspiracy
April 4 – The French army under James FitzJames, 1st Duke of Berwick invades the Basque provinces of Spain, with 20,000 troops crossing into Navarre
May 23 – Mississippi Company becomes the Compagnie Perpétuelle des Indes
 June 30 – Berwick begins the Siege of San Sebastian in northern Spain
 August 19 – San Sebastian surrenders to Berwick. Local leaders petition for the surrounding province to be annexed to France, but is later returned to Spain at the Treaty of The Hague

Births

October 17 – Jacques Cazotte, writer (died 1792)

Deaths
March 3 – Jacques-Louis de Valon, soldier and poet (born 1659)
March 10 – Jean-Baptiste Alexandre Le Blond, architect and garden designer (born 1679)
November 8 – Michel Rolle, mathematician (born 1652)

See also

References

1710s in France